Lee Kwan-Woo (born 25 February 1978) is a retired South Korean football player who played as a midfielder and playmaker.

Growth Background
Born in Seoul, he graduated from Chunghwa Elementary School, Hanyang Middle School, Hanyang Technical High School, and Hanyang University.

Nickname
Sirius : He got the nickname 'Sirius' the brightest star in the sky, for his dazzling play on the ground.
Kwanquelme : Fans called him "Kwanqelme", because his playstyle is similar to Juan Roman Riquelme from Argentina.

Career(simple)

Player
 Daejeon Citizen FC (Korea) : 2000 ~ 2006
 Suwon Samsung Bluewings FC (Korea) : 2006 ~ 2010
 Home United FC (Singapore) : 2013 ~ 2014

Coach
 Suwon Samsung Bluewings FC Youth Team Coach : 2015 ~ 2017
 Suwon FC Head Coach : 2018 ~

Career(detail)

Player
Nicknamed "Sirius" and dubbed "Kwanquelme" by his fans, Lee began his professional football career in the K-League by joining the community based club, Daejeon Citizen in 2000. During his stay in Daejeon, he established himself as a fan favorite with his accurate passes and long shots. In addition, his record of 22 goals and 18 assists made him an icon amongst the Purple Crew; however, in July 2006, he left Daejeon and joined its rival club, Suwon Samsung Bluewings. Before joining the Bluewings, he suffered a knee injury in a car crash. He almost retired but came back strong for Suwon and even made a national squad.

After a poor seasonal campaign in 2005, the Bluewings aimed to rebuild their squad during the transfer window, and brought in Lee Kwan-Woo along with others notably Baek Ji-hoon for the 2006 season. This proved to be a vital move, as the Bluewings finished the season as runners-up despite being one of the top favorites. At the start of the 2007 campaign, he was given the armband for the Suwon Bluewings, but lost his captaincy to his teammate Song Chong-gug at the start of the 2008 season. Nevertheless, his keen passing and ball distribution remain invaluable to the Suwon Bluewings.

He is member of 30-30 Club since August 25, 2007.

In 2013, he joined Home United FC as their club marquee player.

Coach
Lee Kwan-woo worked as a youth coach in Suwon Bluewings from 2015 to 2017. And He has served as a head coach since 2018 under Kim Dae-eui who is the football manager of Suwon FC.

Playing Style
A two-footed player, his shooting was considered outstanding before his knee injury. After returning, he was able to develop more sophisticated shooting techniques. He was also noted for his precise passing and simple but effective dribbling skills.

Club career statistics

International goals
Results list South Korea's goal tally first.

Honours

Club
Suwon Samsung Bluewings
FA Cup runner-up (2006)
K-League runner-up (2006)
Samsung Hauzen Cup Champion (2008)
K League Classic (1): 2008
The Pan Pacific Championship Champion (2009)
FA Cup champion (2009, 2010)

Daejeon Citizen
FA Cup Champion (2001)
Hauzen Cup runner-up (2004)
The Korean Super Cup runner-up (2002)

Individual
 Most Valuable Player Award at the National Football Championship : 1995
 Puma Best 11 MF Part : 2002
 Hummel Korea Sports Today Award for this year's Player of the Year : 2002
 Hummel Korea Sports Today Best 11 : 2003
 K-League Allstar Award : 2003
 Kika Goal Award :2003
K League Best XI: 2003. 2006, 2007
 S.League Player of the Month Of April: 2013
 YEO's Player of the Year: 2013

References

External links
 
 National Team Player Record 
 
 
 news.asiaone.com

1978 births
Living people
Association football midfielders
South Korean footballers
South Korean expatriate footballers
South Korea international footballers
Daejeon Hana Citizen FC players
Suwon Samsung Bluewings players
Home United FC players
K League 1 players
Singapore Premier League players
Expatriate footballers in Singapore
South Korean expatriate sportspeople in Singapore
Footballers from Seoul
Hanyang University alumni
South Korean Buddhists